Billy Thomas Groce (April 16, 1936 – March 15, 2012) was an American football player and coach. He was a three-time letter winner at the University of North Texas–then known as North Texas State College–from 1957 to 1959. He was drafted by the Pittsburgh Steelers in the 1958 NFL Draft. Groce served as the head football coach at the University of Arkansas–Monticello from 1970 to 1974, compiling a record of 11–39.

He died in 2012 at the age of 75.

Head coaching record

References

External links
 

1936 births
2012 deaths
American football fullbacks
Arkansas–Monticello Boll Weevils football coaches
North Texas Mean Green football players
SMU Mustangs football players
People from Pittsburg, Texas
Players of American football from Texas